Vladislav Yuryevich Lemish (20 August 1970 – 30 September 2021) was a Russian and Azerbaijani professional footballer who played as a forward.

International career
Lemish played one game for the Russia national team on 16 August 1992, when he came on as a substitute for the last ten minutes of a friendly match against Mexico. That was the first game Russia played under its name after the break-up of Soviet Union. He later played a game for the Azerbaijan national team.

References

External links
 Player profile 
 

1970 births
2021 deaths
Footballers from Baku
Soviet footballers
Russian footballers
Azerbaijani footballers
Association football forwards
Russia international footballers
Azerbaijan international footballers
Dual internationalists (football)
Russian Premier League players
FC Kuban Krasnodar players
FC Torpedo Moscow players
RCD Espanyol footballers
Palamós CF footballers
PFC CSKA Moscow players
FC Dynamo Stavropol players
FC Baltika Kaliningrad players
FC Slavia Mozyr players
Neftçi PFK players
Russian expatriate footballers
Azerbaijani expatriate footballers
Russian expatriate sportspeople in Spain
Azerbaijani expatriate sportspeople in Spain
Expatriate footballers in Spain
Russian expatriate sportspeople in Belarus
Expatriate footballers in Belarus